Saffron (Mota massyla) is a species of blue butterfly found in South East Asia.

Range
The butterfly occurs in India in the Himalayas from Sikkim to Bhutan, Assam and Manipur. It extends to Sylhet and Naga hills. The range extends eastwards to northern Thailand and southern Yunnan.

Cited references

See also
List of butterflies of India (Lycaenidae)

References
  
 
 
 
 

Mota (butterfly)
Butterflies of Asia